Marek Jacek Wojtera (24 November 1963 – 30 October 2022) was a Polish politician. He was elected to Sejm on 25 September 2005 getting 8715 votes in 11 Sieradz district, candidating from Samoobrona Rzeczpospolitej Polskiej list.

Wojtera died on 30 October 2022, at the age of 58.

See also
Members of Polish Sejm 2005-2007

References

External links
Marek Wojtera - parliamentary page - includes declarations of interest, voting record, and transcripts of speeches.

1963 births
2022 deaths
People from Łęczyca
Members of the Polish Sejm 2005–2007
United People's Party (Poland) politicians
Self-Defence of the Republic of Poland politicians